Karsten Leitner (born 4 June 1995) is a Canadian rugby union player, currently playing for the Seattle Seawolves of Major League Rugby (MLR). His preferred position is wing.

Professional career
Leitner signed for Major League Rugby side Seattle Seawolves during the 2021 Major League Rugby season. Leitner had previously represented the Canada Sevens team at 4 competitions between 2016 and 2017, and also represented Canada A in 2017.

References

External links
itsrugby.co.uk Profile

1995 births
Living people
Canadian rugby union players
Rugby union wings
Seattle Seawolves players